Buk District (literally north district) is a district in northwestern Daegu, South Korea. It adjoins Chilgok County on the north. The area is  93.99 km². The population is about 444,923.

Buk-gu was first created as an office of Daegu in 1938, during the period of Japanese rule. It was raised to the status of a district in 1963. For most of the twentieth century, Buk-gu was purely an administrative division of Daegu, without any local autonomy. The first district council was inaugurated in 1991, and the first district head was elected in 1995, as part of nationwide local government reforms.

Kyungpook National University and Yeungjin College are located in Buk-gu.



Library

Bukbu Library is municipal library that is located in Buk-gu. The library opened 24 November 1983. The number of books is total 250,956; that of papers is 31,997.

See also
Subdivisions of South Korea
Kyungpook National University Museum

Notes

External links
Buk-gu homepage 

 
Districts of Daegu